Home fries (US, Canada), house fries (US), American fries (US), fried potatoes (UK, Canada and regional US), Bratkartoffeln (German), bistro potatoes (southeastern US), or peasant potatoes are a type of basic potato dish made by pan- or skillet-frying chunked, sliced, wedged or diced potatoes that are sometimes unpeeled and may have been par-cooked by boiling, baking, steaming, or microwaving.  They are sometimes served as a substitute for hash browns.

Home fries (or fried potatoes) are often paired with onions.

In North America, home fries are popular as a breakfast side dish.

See also

 Bauernfrühstück
 German fries
 French fries
 Hash browns
 List of deep fried foods
 List of potato dishes
 Lyonnaise potatoes
 Potatoes O'Brien
 Waffle fries

References 

Potato dishes
World cuisine
American breakfast foods
Canadian cuisine
British cuisine
German cuisine